Munazzah Arif is a Pakistani actress who predominantly appears in Pakistani television serials. She earlier starred as recurring roles and mostly plays the role of mothers. She made her cinematic debut in Azfar Jaffri's film Heer Maan Ja and later starred in Parde Mein Rehne Do. Some of her notable television appearances where she played supporting roles, include Uraan, Inkaar, Kashf and Khuda Aur Muhabbat.

Filmography

Television series

Film

References

External links 
 
 

1968 births
Pakistani television actresses
Living people
21st-century Pakistani actresses
Actresses in Urdu cinema
Pakistani film actresses